Bruce Boniface, better known by his surname, Boniface (born 5 June 1981) is a singer-songwriter, vocal arranger and record producer best known for his Top 40 hit "Cheeky", which peaked at number 25 on the UK Singles Chart.  The track remained in the chart for three weeks.

Biography
He was born in Seychelles and started his music career at the age of 3.  He had one Christmas and two studio albums by the age of 5. Boniface and his family moved to England when he was 6 years old.  After a short break at age 13, Boniface resumed developing his musical skills and dancing techniques. Among his influences are Michael Jackson, Boyz II Men, Babyface, Lionel Richie and Usher.

In 2002 he reached No. 25 on the UK Singles Chart with a single entitled "Cheeky". He later toured with Destiny's Child in the UK and across Europe in 2002 and 2003.

He was signed to Virgin Records in July 2006.

Discography

Singles
2002: "Cheeky" (#25 UK Singles Chart)
2008: "Maybe She's Sorry"

References

1981 births
Living people
Seychellois emigrants to the United Kingdom
21st-century British singers
21st-century British male singers